Mike Smith (born October 11, 1973) is a musician, best known as the former guitarist of Snot, TheStart, and Limp Bizkit. Currently he is the singer and guitarist for the band Shedding Light (previously known as Evolver). Mike Smith also appeared in Staind's music video "Outside".

Career

Rumbledog 
Mike Smith played the guitar for the hard rock band Rumbledog from 1993 to 1996. Rumbledog formed from the ashes of a previous musical endeavour based in San Francisco named Dirty Looks. Lead singer Henrik Ostergaard brought in Mike Smith as guitarist. The band released two records: Rumbledog (1993) and The Drowning Pool (1995).

Burning Orange 
While writing material for a follow-up to The Drowning Pool, Rumbledog noticed that their sound was significantly changing to a more hardcore and grunge style. This led to friction with the band’s singer and the members ultimately decided to reform under a new name with a new singer.

Smith elected to help form this new band, named Burning Orange, in 1996. They released their 8-track debut album Taar in 1996. The next year, Taar was re-released with additional material and named Thirteen.

Shortly after this release, Burning Orange disbanded and the members went their separate ways.

Snot 
Snot's original guitarist, Sonny Mayo, left in May 1998 and Smith was recruited soon afterward. Snot set out to work on their second album, but in December, lead singer Lynn Strait died in a car accident. The group decided not to continue on, although the album Strait Up was released in 2000 as a tribute to Lynn, with guest vocalists from various bands contributing. Snot bassist John Fahnestock later reported in 2020 during an AMA on Instagram that Smith did not participate in the writing for the album.

Smith would later play with Snot again, replacing Sonny Mayo for a second time, for a European tour in 2015. At the time, Mayo was unable to participate in the 32-day tour due to prior commitments with the non-profit organization Rock 2 Recovery.

TheStart 
Smith went on to form a band called Hero with former Snot drummer Jamie Miller, as well as Aimee Echo & Scott Ellis of Human Waste Project. In July 1999, Hero were signed to 143 Records/Atlantic Records and recorded their debut album named "Circles."

The band was forced to change their name due to legal issues. At the suggestion of Aimee's mother, they changed it to TheStart. In late 2000, Mike Smith left the band. After various issues, the album was eventually released in July 2001 under The Label/Geffen Records and renamed Shakedown!, with the bulk of Smith's parts recut by Miller.

Limp Bizkit 
In late 2001, Limp Bizkit was left without a guitar player due to the departure of Wes Borland. The entire ordeal of choosing a new guitarist was taken very slowly, with various options taken into consideration.

Initially, a nationwide audition, entitled "Put Your Guitar Where Your Mouth Is," was carried out to find a guitarist for the band, but nobody was chosen out of the thousands of participants.

Smith had known members of the band previously, as they were friends with Snot. They decided to give him a shot at the position, and in 2002, he was chosen as the band's guitarist. Fred wanted Mike to create a full album of songs with the band in between their performance at WrestleMania XIX and The Summer Sanitarium Tour. Together they wrote and recorded at least 14 songs of which 7 of them made it onto their fourth studio album, Results May Vary.

During a warmup show at Webster Hall, NYC on July 16, 2003, Smith injured himself after landing awkwardly from a jump while performing. He finished playing the set with the band before leaving in an ambulance. He was later diagnosed with a pinched nerve.

Mike toured with the band throughout 2003 and the first half of 2004. When it was time for the band to return to the studio and record new music, Smith showed little interest. In August 2004, Limp Bizkit and Mike Smith parted ways. To this day both parties kept very quiet on the issue. In 2009, Limp Bizkit bassist Sam Rivers said in an interview that "We really wanted to work with Mike but he just wasn't where we needed him to be".

Evolver 
After his tenure with Limp Bizkit, Mike Smith settled in Baltimore, Maryland and founded the alternative rock band Evolver, with longtime friend Anthony Grabowski on drums. In a surprise move, Smith decided to act as both guitarist and lead vocalist.

After going through various lineups and quietly releasing an independent EP and music video for the song Out of Time, the lineup for Evolver eventually stabilised with Smith on vocals/guitar, John Cummings on lead guitar (later replaced by Drew Yount), Keith Thompson on bass and Anthony Grabowski on drums. This new lineup made their live debut at The Ramshead in Baltimore and continued to play around the state.

Evolver's self-titled debut album, mixed by Brian Virtue and mastered by Brian Johnson, was released on November 8, 2011 after being pushed back numerous time through iTunes. The delays were caused due to the band switching from being completely independent to signing a management deal with Union Entertainment Group, Inc.

Evolver released a new single and music video in 2013, entitled Shut Up, before becoming inactive. During this period of inactivity, Smith worked as a guitar teacher.

Eventually, in late-2018, Mike Smith and several other members from Evolver got back together under the name Shedding Light. Updates were shared through January 2019, showing the band recording music and video content. However, updates quickly stopped before the band again announced that they were in the studio again, recording new music. Reports quickly died down again after two days.

References

External links 
 Evolver official Myspace

1973 births
Living people
Alternative metal guitarists
Limp Bizkit members
People from Baltimore County, Maryland
Snot (band) members